Sebron Williams Dawson was a state legislator in Arkansas. He served in the Arkansas House of Representatives in 1889 and 1891. He represented Jefferson County, Arkansas and was a Republican. He was photographed.

Henry Williams of Lincoln County, Arkansas also served in 1889 and 1891. John Gray Lucas and Henry A. Johnson served in 1891.

References

Year of birth missing (living people)
African-American state legislators in Arkansas
People from Jefferson County, Arkansas